Adrian Butters (born 15 July 1988) is a footballer who plays as a defender. Born in Canada, he represents Guyana at international level.

Club career
Butters played with the Toronto Lynx of the USL Premier Development League in the 2009 and 2010 seasons. He spent the 2011 season with Singaporean club Woodlands Wellington. After a spell in Sweden with Juventus IF, he signed for Australian club Valentine Phoenix in April 2012.

In 2015, he signed with Oakville Blue Devils in their inaugural season in League1 Ontario and won the 2015 League1 Championship, subsequently also winning the 2015 Inter-Provincial Cup series against PLSQ champions Mont-Royal Outremont.

In 2016, he signed with the York Region Shooters of the Canadian Soccer League, and since then has also featured for Vaughan Azzurri in League1 Ontario. He scored in the 2016 Championship match against FC London as Vaughan won the League1 Ontario title. He returned to the York Region Shooters for the 2017 season.

College career
In 2019, he played for the Ontario Tech Ridgebacks, playing in two games.

International career
Butters has represented Guyana at senior international level, making his debut in 2011.

International career statistics

International goals
Scores and results list Guyana's goal tally first.

References

1988 births
Living people
Canadian sportspeople of Guyanese descent
Canadian soccer players
Guyanese footballers
Guyana international footballers
Woodlands Wellington FC players
Juventus IF players
Valentine Phoenix FC players
Singapore Premier League players
Association football defenders
Canadian expatriate soccer players
Guyanese expatriate footballers
Canadian expatriate sportspeople in Singapore
Guyanese expatriate sportspeople in Singapore
Expatriate footballers in Singapore
Canadian expatriate sportspeople in Sweden
Guyanese expatriate sportspeople in Sweden
Expatriate footballers in Sweden
Canadian expatriates in Australia
Guyanese expatriate sportspeople in Australia
Expatriate soccer players in Australia
Black Canadian soccer players
Canadian Soccer League (1998–present) players
York Region Shooters players
Toronto Lynx players
USL League Two players
League1 Ontario players
Blue Devils FC players
Vaughan Azzurri players